The South Coast Open was a professional golf tournament held between 1975 and 1978 at Catalina Country Club in Batemans Bay on the South Coast of New South Wales, Australia. The 1975 and March 1976 events had prize money of A$10,000 with later events having prize money of A$15,000.

A pro-am was organised at Catalina Country Club by Batemans Bay Lions Club in February 1974. Vic Bennetts won with a score of 137. Prize money was A$6,000.

The March 1976 event was abandoned because of a flooded course. No play was possible on the first day and the event was re-arranged so that there would be 36 holes on the Sunday. However, after a second day without any play, the tournament was abandoned.

An event was scheduled for September 1979 but was cancelled due to lack of sponsorship.

Winners

References

Golf tournaments in Australia
Golf in New South Wales
South Coast (New South Wales)